William H. Long House is a historic home located at Greenville, Pitt County, North Carolina. It was built in 1917–1918, and is a two-story, brick veneer dwelling with Classical Revival style design elements. It a hipped roof intersected by gable roofed wings on the back and sides. It features a monumental pedimented portico and porte cochere supported by paired Tuscan order columns. It was built by William Henry Long (1866–1920), who served as mayor of Greenville from 1901 to 1903. It was renovated about 1980 to house law offices.

It was added to the National Register of Historic Places in 1982.

References

Houses on the National Register of Historic Places in North Carolina
Neoclassical architecture in North Carolina
Houses completed in 1918
Houses in Pitt County, North Carolina
National Register of Historic Places in Greenville, North Carolina